The 17th Central Politburo of the Chinese Communist Party was elected by the 17th Central Committee of the Chinese Communist Party on October 22, 2007. Eventually, four members of this Politburo were expelled from the Communist Party for not adhering to the leading party thought. They were, in order of the time of expulsion, Bo Xilai, Xu Caihou, Zhou Yongkang, and Guo Boxiong.  This politburo was preceded by the 16th Politburo of the Chinese Communist Party and succeeded by the 18th Politburo of the Chinese Communist Party.

Members 
 In stroke order of surnames:
Xi Jinping, Top-ranked Secretary of CCP Secretariat, Vice-President, Vice-Chairman of the Central Military Commission, President of the Central Party School
Wang Gang, Vice-Chair of CPPCC National Committee
Wang Lequan, Party chief of Xinjiang (until 2010), Deputy secretary of the Central Political and Legal Affairs Commission
Wang Zhaoguo, Vice-Chairman of National People's Congress, Chair of the All-China Federation of Trade Unions
Wang Qishan, Vice-Premier
Hui Liangyu, Vice-Premier
Liu Qi, Party chief of Beijing, head of Beijing Olympics organizing committee
Liu Yunshan, Secretary of CCP Central Secretariat, Head of the CCP Propaganda Department
Liu Yandong, State Councilor
Li Changchun, Chairman of the Central Guidance Commission on Building Spiritual Civilization
Li Keqiang, First Vice-Premier
Li Yuanchao, Secretary in CCP Central Secretariat, CCP Organization Department head
Wu Bangguo, Chairman of the Standing Committee of the National People's Congress
Wang Yang, Party chief of Guangdong
Zhang Gaoli, Party chief of Tianjin
Zhang Dejiang, Vice-Premier, Party chief of Chongqing (concurrent from 2012)
Zhou Yongkang, Secretary of the Central Political and Legal Affairs Commission
Hu Jintao, CCP General Secretary, PRC President, Chairman of the Central Military Commission
Yu Zhengsheng, Party chief of Shanghai
He Guoqiang, Secretary of the Central Commission for Discipline Inspection
Jia Qinglin, Chairman of the National Committee of the Chinese People's Political Consultative Conference
Xu Caihou, Vice-Chairman of Central Military Commission
Guo Boxiong, Vice-Chairman of Central Military Commission
Wen Jiabao, Premier of the State Council
Bo Xilai, party chief of Chongqing (Removed from office in 2012 and suspended from the Politburo)

Standing Committee members 

 Ordered in political position ranking 
Hu Jintao
Wu Bangguo
Wen Jiabao
Jia Qinglin
Li Changchun
Xi Jinping
Li Keqiang
He Guoqiang
Zhou Yongkang

Politburo of the Chinese Communist Party
2007 establishments in China
2012 disestablishments in China